Kazuo Uzuki is the subject of a baseball card issued by Topps as an April Fools' Day hoax. The card was released on February 6, 2008 of a supposed high school superstar named Kazuo "The Uzi" Uzuki.  In Japanese, Kazuo Uzuki means "the first son of April." The person actually depicted on the card was a New York University law student named Sensen Lin.

He is listed as 5'11" and 165 lbs and could supposedly throw a 104 mph pitch.  According to the card, Uzuki would be the first Japanese player to go straight from high school in Japan into professional baseball in the United States.

The Uzuki rookie card was found in one out of every 72 packs of cards.  When the card was released, people did not know that it was a joke and the card was trading for around $10–$15 on eBay.

Also, the card said that an MLB scout called him the best pitching prospect in 30 years and he is getting an astronomical deal. Also, the card says he threw 17 strikeouts in 7 innings at a WBC squad trial.

See also

Sidd Finch

References

Practical jokes
April Fools' Day
Nonexistent people used in hoaxes
Fictional baseball players
Hoaxes in the United States
Fictional Japanese people
2008 in baseball
2008 hoaxes